The Krugovaya Kinopanorama or Circular Kinopanorama - is a cinema in Moscow of Russia which plays Krugorama, a type of cinema presentation in which film is projected on a circular screen with a horizontal 360° view. This was pioneered in 1896 by French engineer Raoul Grimoin-Sanson, who played ten projectors simultaneously on a circular screen, a process he called Cinéorama. Cinerama though spelled similarly has a different meaning, and denotes three projectors on an arched screen, as does Kinopanorama. The technology used in the Moscow Circular Kinopanorama was also previously carried out by Walt Disney in 1955, in a process he called Circarama (later known as Circle-Vision 360° from 1967 onward).

Moscow Circular Kinopanorama 
On the site of the All-Russia Exhibition Centre in Moscow is a working example of the Circular Kinopanorama technology which bears the name Krygovaya Kinopanorama. It was built in 1959 and projects film from 11 synchronously working cameras onto 11 screens arranged in a cylindrical brick and glass building.

Special systems of movie-cameras were needed for the exposure of this theatre's films. In the pursuit of these a number of complex technical problems were solved. For example, in 1959 the designers of the Yakovlev design bureau managed to develop a suspension device for shooting circular kinopanoramic films from a Yak-24 helicopter. Developing these cameras simultaneously solved the task of carriage of goods with minimal transfer of vibration.

Since 2006, after more than a ten-year recess, the Krygovaya Kinopanorama is again opened to audiences. The repertoire of the theatre consists of films shot in the Soviet years.

References

External links 
The web site of the cinema: http://krugorama.narod.ru
 http://cinemaofrepeatfilm.ru/en/
 http://cinemaofrepeatfilm.ru/en/circular-kinopanorama-pavilion-at-vdnh/
 http://www.artinfo.ru/RU/news/main/Panorama-2006-O_Chernisheva-SAG-E_Degot.htm
 https://web.archive.org/web/20070927131151/http://www.artmargins.com/content/feature/degot.htm
 http://www.in70mm.com/news/2004/circlorama/index.htm
 http://www.in70mm.com/news/2007/circlorama/index.htm
 

Buildings and structures completed in 1959
Cinemas in Russia
Buildings and structures built in the Soviet Union
Buildings and structures in Moscow
Exhibition of Achievements of National Economy